"My Heart' is a song written by Don Pfrimmer and Charles Quillen, and recorded by American country music artist Ronnie Milsap.  It was released in March 1980 as the second single from the album Milsap Magic. Released as a double A-side with "Silent Night (After the Fight)", the song became Milsap's fourteenth number one country hit. The single stayed at number one for three weeks and spent a total of thirteen weeks on the country chart.

Chart performance

Year-end charts

References

1980 singles
Ronnie Milsap songs
Billboard Hot Country Songs number-one singles of the year
Songs written by Don Pfrimmer
Songs written by Charles Quillen
RCA Records singles
1980 songs